Hypselospinus is a genus of iguanodontian dinosaur which was first described as a species of Iguanodon (I. fittoni) by Richard Lydekker in 1889, the specific name honouring William Henry Fitton.

History
 
In May 2010 the fossils comprising Hypselospinus were by David Norman reclassified as a separate genus, among them the holotype BMNH R1635, consisting of a left ilium, a sacrum, tail vertebrae and teeth. The generic name is derived from Greek hypselos, "high" and Latin spina, "thorn", in reference to the high vertebral spines. Later that same year, a second group of scientists independently re-classified I. fittoni into a new genus they named Wadhurstia, which thus is a junior objective synonym of Hypselospinus. Hypselospinus lived during the lower Valanginian stage, around 140 million years ago. A contemporary of Barilium (also once thought to be a species of Iguanodon), Hypselospinus was a lightly built iguanodontian estimated at 6 metres (19.7 ft) long. The species Iguanodon fittoni was described from remains discovered in 1886 alongside an unnamed ichthyosaur in the lower Valanginian-age Lower Cretaceous Wadhurst Clay of East Sussex, England. Remains from Spain may also pertain to it. Norman (2004) wrote that three partial skeletons are known for it, but this is an error.

Hypselospinus is separated from Barilium on the basis of vertebral and pelvic characters, size, and build. For example, Barilium was more robust than Hypselospinus, with large Camptosaurus-like vertebrae featuring short neural spines,  whereas Hypselospinus is known for its "long, narrow, and steeply inclined neural spines".

References 

Iguanodonts
Valanginian life
Early Cretaceous dinosaurs of Europe
Cretaceous England
Fossils of England
Fossil taxa described in 2010
Taxa named by David B. Norman
Ornithischian genera